The St Peters Town Hall is an Australian heritage-listed town hall located at 101 Payneham Rd, St Peters SA. St Peters is an eastern suburb in Adelaide. It was built in 1927 in the Inter-War Free Classical architectural style by architects J. Campbell & Son, and replaced the 1878 St Peters Town Hall, which was located on the Princes Highway and was resumed by the state government in 1926 for road-widening. The Town Hall was the seat of St Peters Municipal Council from 1927 to 1948 and from 1949 was a branch library and community hall of the Municipality of Marrickville, which absorbed St Peters.

First Town Hall, 1878–1929

Second St Peters Town Hall
Designed by J. Campbell & Son, the foundation stone of the town hall was laid by Deputy Mayor Edward Burrows on 16 April 1927. Completed to a cost of £7000, the hall was officially opened by the mayor, George Rowswell, on 3 December 1927.

Heritage listing and conservation
The Town Hall and its interiors was first listed in 2001 under the Marrickville Local Environment Plan (updated 2011) as "one of the last buildings which commemorates the old Municipality of St Peters."

Gallery

See also

 List of town halls in Sydney
 Architecture of Sydney

References

External links
 St Peters Town Hall – Inner West Council

Government buildings completed in 1927
1927 establishments in Australia
Town halls in Sydney
Art Deco architecture in Sydney
Inner West